Francis James "Frank" Oliver (24 December 1948 – 16 March 2014) was a New Zealand rugby union player and coach.  He captained the New Zealand national side, the All Blacks, in four matches.

Biography
Born in Dunedin and educated at Lawrence District High School, Oliver made his provincial rugby debut for Southland in 1969. He later also played for Otago and Manawatu, playing a total of 213 first-class games.

Oliver played in the forwards as a lock and appeared in 43 matches for the All Blacks — 17 of them full test appearances — between 1976 and 1981, captaining the team in four matches. After retiring as a player in 1983, Oliver coached the Manawatu provincial team from 1995 to 1997 and the short-lived Central Vikings merged team from 1998 to 1999.

Oliver's son Anton followed in his father's footsteps, representing both Otago and New Zealand, and being All Blacks' captain. They are the first — and so far only — father-and-son combination to have captained the national side.

Outside of rugby, Oliver worked in forestry, and was running a sawmill business up until his death in 2014.

References

1948 births
2014 deaths
New Zealand international rugby union players
New Zealand rugby union coaches
New Zealand rugby union players
Otago rugby union players
Manawatu rugby union players
Southland rugby union players
Rugby union players from Dunedin
Rugby union locks
People from Milton, New Zealand
Rugby union players from Palmerston North